Modern Husbands (Spanish:Maridos modernos) is a 1948 Argentine comedy film directed by Luis Bayón Herrera and starring Olinda Bozán, Francisco Álvarez and Oscar Valicelli.

The film's art direction was by Juan Manuel Concado.

Cast
 Olinda Bozán 
 Francisco Álvarez 
 Oscar Valicelli 
 Aída Alberti 
 Raimundo Pastore 
 Pepita Muñoz
 Betty Lagos 
 Juan José Porta 
 Nelly Scheila
 Marino Seré

References

Bibliography 
 Roberto Blanco Pazos & Raúl Clemente. Diccionario de actrices del cine argentino, 1933-1997. Corregidor, 1997.

External links 
 

1948 comedy films
Argentine comedy films
1948 films
1940s Spanish-language films
Films directed by Luis Bayón Herrera
Argentine black-and-white films
1940s Argentine films